Isyanovo (İśän) is a rural locality (a village) in Nigamatovsky Selsoviet, Baymaksky District, Bashkortostan, Russia. The population was 176 as of 2010. There are 6 streets.

Geography 
Isyanovo is located 28 km north of Baymak (the district's administrative centre) by road. Bakhtigareyevo is the nearest rural locality.

References 

Rural localities in Baymaksky District